Klub Piłkarski Gopło Kruszwica is a football club from Kruszwica, Poland. It was found in 1925.They're currently playing in Liga Okręgowa (VI level).

References
 Info about club on 90minut.pl
{http://www.90minut.pl/liga/0/liga9622.html}

Association football clubs established in 1925
1925 establishments in Poland
Inowrocław County
Football clubs in Kuyavian-Pomeranian Voivodeship